Air Vice Marshal Robert W. "Bob" Judson is a retired senior Royal Air Force officer. He was the first Station Commander of RAF Coningsby in the Eurofighter Typhoon-era.

RAF career
Judson has been involved in many milestone events, personally piloting the 100th Typhoon off the production line to RAF Coningsby from the BAE Systems' Warton factory (Lancs), and acting as overall formation leader for HM The Queen's 80th birthday flypast of nearly 50 aircraft, considered the largest flypast the Royal Air Force has produced in decades.

Promoted to air commodore on 1 July 2007, Judson served as commander of Kandahar Airfield in Afghanistan in 2008, and stars in the Channel Five documentary Warzone, which looks into the life and operations of personnel stationed at the airfield.

Judson was appointed Director Targeting and Information Operations in the Ministry of Defence in November 2008.

Corporate career
Since 2015, Judson is a Director in the Resilience and Crisis Management Team, part of Deloitte UK's Risk Advisory service line.

References

|-

|-

Living people
Royal Air Force air marshals
Royal Air Force personnel of the War in Afghanistan (2001–2021)
Year of birth missing (living people)